"Lolita" is a song by Spanish singer-songwriter Belinda, released as the first promotional single from her third studio album Carpe Diem.

The song was composed by Jimmy Harry, Alaina Beaton, Belinda and Nacho Peregín.

Cultural references
The song refers to the 1955 novel of the same name in the line "Sin duda Nabokov fue el que me escribió", which literally translates as "No doubt, Nabokov was the one who wrote me."

Niñas mal
Lolita was used as the opening theme of MTV Latin America's soap opera Niñas mal – Bad Girls in English – which premiered on September 10, 2010. A music video was filmed and shown on the channel on August 23, 2010.

Music video
The music video was filmed in July, 2010 in Bogotá, Colombia and was directed and produced by MTV's creative team. It shows the main characters of the soap opera "Niñas Mal" causing chaos in a supermarket.

Release
The song was released as a digital download via the iTunes Store on March 2, 2010.

Track list
iTunes Digital download
 "Lolita" (Jimmy Harry, Belinda, Nacho Peregrín & Alaina Beaton) — 3:26

Versions 
 Lolita (Album Version)
 Lolita (Niñas Mal version)

Charts

References

2010 singles
Belinda Peregrín songs
Songs written by Jimmy Harry
Songs written by Nacho Peregrín
Songs written by Belinda Peregrín
2010 songs
Music based on novels
Song recordings produced by Jimmy Harry